Hussein Mohamed Shafiq (more commonly known by his stage name Hussein Riad ((1897–1965) was an Egyptian actor, who mainly played "dad roles". His career spanned about 46 years and he appeared in approximately 320 films, 240 theater plays, and 150 radio and 50 TV plays.

Early life
Riad was born "Hussein Mohamed Shafiq" ( in 1897 in the  Al-Sayeda Zaynab  district of Cairo, Egypt, to an Egyptian father and a Syrian mom. He later changed his name to Hussein Riad. 
 
His brother was into acting too, he was the artist Mohamed Fouad (known by his stage name Fouad Shafiq). In 1916 he quit school to start acting and joined the Arab Acting Institute.

Career
By 1923 Riad worked with Youssef Wahbi's Theatrical Troupe as well as other notable actors. Thereafter, in 1926 Riad started working in silent films. During his career Riad was known as the "father of affection" in many of his roles and participated in many famous works in Egyptian cinema, such as The Good Land, Back Again, Jamila, the Algerian, Among the Ruins, Love and Adoration, Forbidden Women, Dearer than My Life and Saladin.

Awards
In 1963 he received the Egyptian State Award and Medal of Science and Arts.

Death
Riad died on July 17, 1965, of a heart attack. In 2019, his daughter, Fatima, published a book about his life, acting career and death, and dedicated it to all his fans.

References

External links 
 

1897 births
1965 deaths
Egyptian male film actors
Egyptian male stage actors
Egyptian male television actors
Male actors from Cairo